is a Japanese track and field sprinter who specialises in the 400 metres. His personal best in the event is 45.79 seconds. He competed in the 4 × 400 metres relay at the 2015 World Championships without qualifying for the final.

Personal bests

International competition

National titles

References

External links

1990 births
Living people
Japanese male sprinters
Sportspeople from Kanagawa Prefecture
World Athletics Championships athletes for Japan
People from Hadano, Kanagawa
Tokai University alumni
21st-century Japanese people